Charles Fellows was a British archaeologist.

Charles Fellow(e)s may also refer to:
 Charlie Fellows (rugby union) (born 1988), English rugby union player
Charles Fellowes (1823–1886), Royal Navy officer